The Mystery of the Blue Room (Czech: Záhada modrého pokoje) is a 1933 Czechoslovak mystery film, directed by Miroslav Cikán. It is a remake of the German film Secret of the Blue Room (1932). It stars Karel Hašler, František Kovářík, and Jaroslav Marvan.

Synopsis
At a country house, to impress his girlfriend a young man volunteers to spend the night in the famous Blue Room where a notorious murder took place many years before. In the morning he has completely vanished.

Cast
Karel Hašler as Count Hellford
František Kovářík as Valet Pavel
Jaroslav Marvan as Inspector Gent
Antonín Novotný 			
Helena Sedláková as Betty
Jiřina Šejbalová as Countess Hellford
František Smolík as the Stranger
Milada Smolíková as Marie
Jan Sviták as Naval officer
Miroslav Svoboda as Tom Brandt
Bedřich Vrbský as Betectiv Brown
Rudolf Žák as Plainclothes Man

References

Bibliography
 Alfred Krautz. International Directory of Cinematographers Set and Costume Designers in Film: Czechoslovakia. Saur, 1991.

External links
Záhada modrého pokoje at the Internet Movie Database

1933 films
Czechoslovak mystery films
1933 mystery films
Films directed by Miroslav Cikán
Czech mystery films
Remakes of German films
Czechoslovak black-and-white films
1930s Czech films